Belaya Glina is a rural locality (a selo) and the administrative center of Beloglinsky District of Krasnodar Krai, Russia, located  northeast from Krasnodar, on the banks of the Rassypnaya River. Population: 

It was founded in 1820.

References

Rural localities in Krasnodar Krai
Beloglinsky District